Cap-Vert is a volcanic field in Senegal with a surface of . The field covers the Cape Verde peninsula close to Dakar and was active until 600,000 years ago. The position of the dykes and lava flows has been influenced by local fault systems.

References

Sources 

 

Pleistocene volcanoes
Geography of Senegal